Marc Erzberger (born 12 March 1968) is a Swiss windsurfer. He competed in the Windglider event at the 1984 Summer Olympics.

References

1968 births
Living people
Swiss male sailors (sport)
Swiss windsurfers
Olympic sailors of Switzerland
Sailors at the 1984 Summer Olympics – Windglider
Place of birth missing (living people)